Eddie Tilley (14 October 1920 – 22 July 2006) was a former Australian rules footballer and coach who played for Sturt in the South Australian National Football League (SANFL).

References

External links 

1920 births
2006 deaths
Sturt Football Club players
Sturt Football Club coaches
Australian rules footballers from South Australia
People from Adelaide